Lathrocordulia is a genus of dragonfly in the family Austrocorduliidae,
endemic to Australia.
Species of Lathrocordulia are medium-sized, bronze to black dragonflies without pale markings,

Species
The genus Lathrocordulia includes the following species:
 Lathrocordulia garrisoni  – Queensland swiftwing
 Lathrocordulia metallica  – Western swiftwing

Note about family
There are differing views as to the family that Lathrocordulia best belongs to:
 It is considered to be part of the Austrocorduliidae family at the Australian Faunal Directory
 It is considered to be part of the Synthemistidae family in the World Odonata List at the Slater Museum of Natural History
 It is considered to be part of the Corduliidae family at Wikispecies

See also
 List of Odonata species of Australia

References

Austrocorduliidae
Anisoptera genera
Odonata of Australia
Endemic fauna of Australia
Taxa named by Robert John Tillyard
Insects described in 1911
Taxonomy articles created by Polbot